António Manuel Soares dos Reis (Vila Nova de Gaia, 14 October 1847 - Vila Nova de Gaia, 16 February 1889) was a Portuguese sculptor.

Studies
He first studied at the Portuense Academy of Fine Arts, where he graduated in sculpture in 1867. He studied at the École des Beaux-Arts in Paris, from 1867 to 1870, where he achieved several prizes, and in Rome (1871–1872). It was there that he executed his finest work, in Carrara marble, the acclaimed "O Desterrado" ("The Exiled"), a touching image of neoclassical, romantic and realist resemblances, that is the masterpiece of Portuguese sculpture.

After returning to Portugal, he returned to Porto, where he taught at the Portuense Academy of Fine Arts.

Misunderstood and little credited in life, he committed suicide, aged only 41. He is considered, by far, one of the leading names in Portuguese realist sculpture.

Fame
The finest collection of his pieces is shown in a room dedicated to him at the National Museum Soares dos Reis, in Porto, including "O Desterrado" and the touching and kind figuration of the "Count of Ferreira" (1876).

In 1949, a short film was made about him, entitled "O Desterrado - Vida e Obra de Soares dos Reis" (The Exiled - Life and works of Soares dos Reis).

External links
António Soares dos Reis Biography (Portuguese)

References

1847 births
1889 deaths
Portuguese sculptors
Male sculptors
Portuguese Roman Catholics
Artists who committed suicide
University of Porto alumni
Suicides by firearm in Portugal
People from Vila Nova de Gaia
19th-century Portuguese people
19th-century sculptors
1880s suicides